Gabriel Liiceanu (b. May 23, 1942, Râmnicu Vâlcea) is a Romanian philosopher.

He graduated from the University of Bucharest's Faculty of Philosophy in 1965, and from Faculty of Classical Languages in 1973. He earned a doctorate in philosophy at the University of Bucharest in 1976. Between 1965 and 1975, Liiceanu was a researcher at the Institute of Philosophy, and between 1975 and 1989 at the Institute of Art History. He received a fellowship from the Humboldt Foundation between 1982 and 1984.

He has been the manager of Humanitas publishing house since 1990 . He has been professor at the University of Bucharest's Faculty of Philosophy since 1992. Liiceanu is also a founding member of the Group for Social Dialogue (1990), president of the Romanian Publishers' Association (since 2000), and member of the scientific council of New Europe College. Between 1998 and 2001, he was a member of the Romanian National Television's Administrative Board.

He was greatly influenced by his mentor, Constantin Noica, especially during the time spent at Păltiniș, an experience that he evokes in "Jurnalul de la Păltiniș" ("The Păltiniș Diary"). Noica, a Romanian philosopher known abroad as well as in the country, used to take his most valuable students and followers to his small house at Păltiniș, where he would teach them what they afterwards called "not philosophy lessons, but spiritual experiences". Another Noica follower who was invited to Păltiniș was Andrei Pleșu (Liiceanu and Pleșu are still friends today). Liiceanu refers to that experience in his books as the "Păltiniș School" and the term began to be widely accepted and used in Romanian, as well as European, philosophy. Liiceanu continued to publish well into the 2000s, and he remains a mainstream figure in Romanian intellectual public life, with close connections with Andrei Pleșu, Monica Lovinescu, and Virgil Ierunca. One critic, Gabriel Andreescu, suggested that Liiceanu allegedly facilitated extremism by allowing his publishing house to edit the works of inter-war (Communist-persecuted) Romanian figures whom Andreescu accused of being "ideologues of right-wing extremism".

Work

Books
 Tragicul. O fenomenologie a limitei și depășirii (The Tragic - A Phenomenology of limit and overtaking), 1975
 Încercare în politropia omului și a culturii (Essay on the polytropy of man and culture), 1981
 Jurnalul de la Păltiniș. Un model paideic în cultura umanistă (The Paltiniş Diary: A Paideic Model in Humanist Culture), 1983
 Le Journal de Păltiniș, La Decouverte, Paris, 1998
 Paltiniș Diary, CEU Press, Budapest and New York, 2000
 Epistolar (Epistolary), 1987, coauthor and editor
 Apel către lichele (Appeal to knaves), 1992
 Cearta cu filozofia. Eseuri (Quarrel with philosophy. Essays), 1992
 Despre limită (On limit), 1994
 De la limite, Ed. Michalon, Paris, 1997
 Itinerariile unei vieţi: EM. Cioran urmat de Apocalipsa după Cioran. Trei zile de convorbiri - 1990, 1995
 Itineraires d'une vie: E.M. Cioran suivi de Les Continents de l'insomnie, Ed. Michalon, Paris, 1995
 Apocalypsen enligt Cioran, Dualis Forlags, Ludvika, Suedia, 1997
 Declarație de iubire (Love declaration), 2001
 Ușa interzisă (The Forbidden door), 2002
 Om și simbol. Interpretări ale simbolului în teoria artei și filozofia culturii (Man and Symbol. Interpretations of the symbol in art theory and culture philosophy), 2005
 Despre minciună (On lie), 2006
 Despre ură (On hate), 2007
 Scrisori către fiul meu, 2008
 Întâlnire cu un necunoscut, 2010
 Întâlnire în jurul unei palme Zen, 2011
 Meeting with a Stranger

His books are currently being published in Brazil by Editora Ecclesiae.

Translations
From Greek and German:
 Plato, Aristotelic commentators, German philosophers (Martin Heidegger, Schelling)

Movies
 Exercițiu de admirație (Exercise of Admiration), 1991, with Constantin Chelba (coauthor)
 interview with Eugène Ionesco, 1992
 Apocalipsa după Cioran (Apocalypse according to Cioran), 1995, with Sorin Ilieșiu (coauthor)

Audiobooks
 Ușa interzisă (The Forbidden Door), 2003
 Noica, 2003, with Andrei Pleșu (coauthor)
 Apel către lichele (Appeal to knaves), 2006
 Declaraţie de iubire (Love declaration), 2006
 Sebastian, mon frère. Scrisoare către un frate mai mare (Sebastian, mon frère. Letter to an elder brother), 2006
 Strategii ale seducţiei. De la Romeo și Julieta la sărutul cioranian (Strategies of seduction. From Romeo and Juliet to Cioranian kiss), 2006

Awards
 Romanian Writers' Union Prize, 1983, for Păltiniș Diary
 Chevalier de l'Ordre des Arts et des Lettres, 1992
 Great Prize of the Romanian Film-makers Union, 1992, ex-aequo, for Exercise of Admiration
 Cross of Merit, First class, of the Order of Merit of the Federal Republic of Germany, 2006, for promotion of German language and culture in Romania
 Knight of the Order of the Star of Romania, 2006

References

External links
 http://www.cariereonline.ro/articol/gabriel-liiceanu-conducatorul-seducator 
 http://www.evz.ro/dragnea-il-face-mincinos-pe-liiceanu-o-minciuna-este-o-minciuna.html
 http://www.evz.ro/dragnea-scrisoare-catre-presedintele-comisiei-libe.html
 https://ecclesiae.com.br/index.php?route=product/author&author_id=1034
 https://zoso.ro/pana-acum-avem/

Romanian book publishers (people)
Romanian essayists
Romanian film directors
Romanian journalists
20th-century Romanian philosophers
21st-century Romanian philosophers
Romanian translators
People from Râmnicu Vâlcea
Gheorghe Lazăr National College (Bucharest) alumni
University of Bucharest alumni
Academic staff of the University of Bucharest
Knights of the Order of the Star of Romania
Chevaliers of the Ordre des Arts et des Lettres
Officers Crosses of the Order of Merit of the Federal Republic of Germany
1942 births
Living people